Chirrantan Bhatt is an Indian musician, composer and singer. He is active in the Indian film industry, Bollywood, and has also composed music for Telugu films. He is best nown for his melody compositions. 

He is a member of the Gujarati Bhatt family, noted film-makers and directors in Bollywood cinema, and is the grandson of Vijay Bhatt. He is the son of Arun Bhatt, a well known producer and director of Gujarati films.

Bhatt made his debut as a composer in the Hindi film Mission Istaanbul in 2008. He had musical hits such as Shaapit, Haunted 3D, and 1920: Evil Returns in the beginning of his career and later composed chartbusters like "Har Kisi Ko Nahin Milta" in Akshay Kumar's Boss, "Teri Meri Kahaani" and "Coffee Peete Peete" in Gabbar Is Back, "Bawra Mann" in Jolly LLB 2 and "Uska Hi Banana" in 1920: Evil Returns.

After Gabbar Is Back, director Krish offered his Telugu venture, Kanche, to Bhatt, who received rave reviews for his music and background score. The score won him two major awards in 2016 - the GAMA Award in Dubai and the CineMAA Award in Hyderabad. He was also nominated for Best Music Director for Kanche by the Telugu Filmfare Awards. The film also won the prestigious National Award 2016 in the Best Regional Film category.

Bhatt later worked on another period film, Gautamiputra Satakarni, directed by Krish and starring Telugu superstar Nandmuri Balakrishna. Bhatt impressed both audiences and critics with his music and background score for this film.

Bhatt created the music and background score for Nandmuri Balakrishna's mass entertainer Jai Simha, with the song "Ammakutti Ammakutti" becoming a rage. Chirrantan Bhatt has been nominated in the best Music Album category for the Filmfare Awards 2020 for his contribution to the Akshay Kumar film - Kesari and won the Radio Mirchi award for the same. His music for Nandamuri Balakrishna's Telugu film, Ruler was also well received by the audience with Padataadhu Taadhu and Yaala Yaala becoming instant hits.

Discography

References

External links
 

Year of birth missing (living people)
Living people
Indian film score composers
Chirrantan